Nandalal Krishnamoorthy better known by his stage name Nandu is an Indian actor primarily working in Malayalam, and a few Hindi and Tamil films. Although he has been in the industry for more than 30 years, he is acclaimed for his performance in Mohanlal' s Spirit, directed by Ranjith. He was also seen in many Priyadarsan films. He received SIIMA award for best supporting actor, for the movie Spirit.

Personal life

Nandu was born in 1965 at Thycaud, Thiruvananthapuram, to Krishnamoorthy, a table tennis coach at National Institute of Sports and Sukumari, a singer. He lost his mother 60 days after he was born, and was brought up by his uncle and aunt. His father never remarried, and died while giving table tennis lessons. His first film was Sarvakalasala (1986), directed by Venu Nagavally. During his early career, most of his roles were of college background.

Nandu is married to Kavitha Nandalal, since 1997. They have a daughter, Nandita (b. 1999) and a son, Krishan (b. 2013).

Career

He started his career with the Mohanlal starring film Sarvakalasala in 1986. Although he has been in the film industry for the last 20 years, he recently has been acclaimed for his performance in the Mohanlal-starring film Spirit, directed by Ranjith. Although he had played good roles in the past, he has been most acclaimed for his performance in Spirit.

Filmography

Malayalam

1980s

1990s

2000s

2010s

2020s

Hindi
 1993 - Gardish
 1998 - Doli Saja Ke Rakhna
 2003 - Hungama
 2021 - Hungama 2

Tamil
 2003 - Lesa Lesa as Nandu

As voice actor

Television career
Sathyam Shivam Sundaram (Amrita TV)
Devimahathmyam (Asianet)
Sri Mahabhagavatham (Asianet)
Swami ayyapan (Asianet)
Chandrodayam(DD Malayalam)

Awards and nominations
Nominations
Filmfare Awards South- Best Supporting Actor- (Spirit)

References

The Hindu Actor Nandulal. Photo: Special Arrangement TOPICS cinema Malayalam cinema people celebrity Actor Nandulal Krishnamoorthy has found his space in tinselville post his spirited performance in Spirit. 
Nandu Profile
Actor Nandu at CiniDiary

External links 

 
 Nandu at MSI

Male actors from Thiruvananthapuram
Male actors in Malayalam cinema
Indian male film actors
21st-century Indian male actors
Living people
1965 births
20th-century Indian male actors
Male actors in Hindi cinema
Male actors in Tamil cinema
Indian male television actors
Male actors in Malayalam television
South Indian International Movie Awards winners